Brisbane Blaze is an Australian hockey club based in Brisbane, Queensland. The club was established in 2019, and is one of 7 established to compete in Hockey Australia's new premier domestic competition, Hockey One.

The club unifies both men and women under one name, unlike Queensland's former representation in the Australian Hockey League as the QLD Blade (men) and QLD Scorchers (women).

Brisbane Blaze will compete for the first time in the inaugural season of Hockey One, which will be contested from late September through to mid November 2019.

History
Brisbane Blaze, along with six other teams, was founded on 17 April 2019 as part of Hockey Australia's development of hockey.

The team's logo and colours are inspired by the new team name, 'Blaze', which is an adaption of Queensland's former representative women's team the Scorchers. The new colours are burnt orange and yellow.

Home Stadium
Brisbane Blaze are based out of Queensland Hockey Centre in Queensland's capital city, Brisbane. The stadium has a capacity of 1,000 spectators, with additional seating available.

Throughout Hockey One, the team will play three home matches at the stadium.

Teams

Men's team
The following players were names in the men's preliminary squad.

 Jacob Anderson
 Cade Banditt
 Daniel Beale
 Robert Bell
 Scott Boyde
 Jarrod Brown
 Luca Brown
 Jared Carseldine
 Justin Douglas
 Matthew Finn
 Michael Francis
 Liam Hart
 Ashley Hennegan
 Tim Howard
 Adam Imer
 Shane Kenny
 Mitchell Nicholson
 Hugh Pembroke
 Matthew Pembroke
 Joel Rintala
 Matthew Shaw
 Matthew Swann
 Jared Taylor
 Corey Weyer
 Jacob Whetton
 Ethan White
 Blake Wotherspoon
 Dylan Wotherspoon

Women's team
The following players were names in the women's preliminary squad.

 Hannah Astbury
 Emily Burrows
 Layla Eleison
 Ashlea Fey
 Madison Fitzpatrick
 Savannah Fitzpatrick
 Morgan Gallagher
 Rebecca Greiner
 Georgia Hillas
 Jordyn Holzberger
 Madeleine James
 Jodie Kenny
 Stephanie Kershaw
 Jasmine Larosa
 Hannah Lowry
 Ambrosia Malone
 Morgan Mathison
 Ashlyn McBurnie
 Aleisha Neumann
 Britt Noffke
 Meg Pearce
 Jesse Reid
 Zoe Smart
 Natarlia Smith
 Jamie Stone
 Renee Taylor
 Jessica Watson
 Britt Wilkinson
 Emily Witheyman-Crump

References

External links

Australian field hockey clubs
Women's field hockey teams in Australia
Sporting clubs in Brisbane
Field hockey clubs established in 2019
2019 establishments in Australia
Hockey One